The 2001 Kampung Medan riots is a sectarian violence between the Indian and Malay that initially began in a small village of Kampung Medan located in Petaling Jaya, Selangor, Malaysia. The riot then further escalated and spread all the way through Kampung Gandhi, Kampung Lindungan , Kampung Datuk Harun, Taman Desa Ria and the surrounding of Jalan Klang Lama. The racial crisis then spread all the way through Petaling Jaya, Jalan Gasing, Kelana Jaya, Sungai Way, Bandar Sunway and Puchong. The riot started from 4 March until 13 March 2001. Photographs in Malaysiakini's possession are gruesome evidence of the extensive hurt, both physical and emotional, inflicted by the clashes.
The three weeks of tension resulted in the deaths of 6 people, and left over a hundred people with severe wounds, ranging from head injuries, broken bones, to slashes and hacked off limbs. Four hundred people were detained.

Background
The residents of Kampung Medan are 70% Malay, 20% Indian and 10% Chinese. The Malays live in low-cost flats and houses. The Chinese are scattered, while the Indians live in longhouses and squatter settlements. Police have admitted they neglected the areas, which had achieved notoriety for gangster activity, drug addiction, juvenile delinquency, fights and even incest. Violence has been a way of life and over the last three years, there have been no fewer than 40 cases of violence involving the squatters and those living in the vicinity. In incidents over the past few days, the villagers have blamed outsiders for the violence.

The riot between the two groups in Kampung Medan resulted from a wedding and a funeral. The wedding ceremony was held by a Malay family in their house, at the same time, their Indian neighbours were having their funeral ceremony.

Rioting

Spark of the riots
On 8 March 2001, an Indian security guard on the way home from work found a tent erected in the middle of the narrow road in Kampung Medan for a wedding. Angry, he began kicking the tables and chairs out of the road. His action angered the Malay family that was preparing for the wedding, and they rushed out to beat him up. The security guard fled and returned later with a parang and five other cohorts. A fight broke out. He ran towards an Indian house, a few hundred metres away, presumably for refuge where a wake was being held, contrary to earlier reports that the fight started because the funeral procession was blocked by the tent. The group of Malays, who thought he was a member of the household, then set fire to a car and two motorcycles. But the spark came four days later when fights broke out after Indian children playing with catapults broke a van windscreen.

The agitated van owner, an Indian, sought compensation from the children's parents. He was joined by his driver, a Malay, but some villagers who saw the commotion thought that a Malay was threatening the Indians. By then, the rumours were flying of an Indian-Malay fight. As with all rumours, more versions of the rumors followed, resulting in mounting tension among the Malays and Indians in the area.

Retaliations and armed response
A six-member team representing a network of NGOs for a Violence Free Community took upon themselves to record the names and injuries of the victims. Below are some of the details:

On 8 March 2001, a 26-year-old Indian construction worker and his friend were returning to their homes in Kampung Semarak off Jalan Klang Lama on a motorcycle at 10.30pm. They were attacked by about 50 Malay youths carrying iron rods, wooden sticks and hockey sticks. His friend escaped, but the construction worker ended up with a broken right leg. Suresh, 19, sustained head injuries when he was assaulted by five Malay people at about 10.30pm. The college student from Taman Medan was returning home when five to six Malay youths blocked his way. They asked him about his ethnic origin. When he told them, Suresh was attacked with sharp instruments and wooden sticks. He passed out. He suffered multiple slash wounds on the head and abdomen. He also suffered a deep slash which almost severed the wrist from his left hand.

On 9 March 2001, Mathavan was assaulted by a gang of Malay youths when he was returning home on a motorcycle. He suffered a leg fracture and injuries on his hands. His motorcycle was torched. Annadurai was carrying goods in his van when Malay youths attacked him near the Shell petrol station in Sri Manja, located near Taman Medan. He suffered injuries on his head and hands. Security guard Kanan was assaulted in Kampung Medan while returning home from work. He had head injuries, a fractured leg and suffered a hemorrhage in his kidney. Rajathurai was on drips and on a resuscitation machine. Naharul Hisham sustained injuries on his hands and his fingers were almost severed.

On 10 March 2001, a Form 5 student from Kampung Gandhi who was in Taman Medan with his brother at 3 p.m. were chased by about 100 Malay men on motorcycles, armed with samurai swords, wooden sticks and iron rods. The two were caught and assaulted. His brother's hands were almost severed. Norhashihadi was returning to Kampung Medan after work when he was attacked by 10 Indian men. He suffered head injuries. In Sungei Way, Indonesian worker Sujari was attacked by six men while Yong So Lin was attacked by three. Muthukumar, from Bidor, Perak, was delivering fruits when he and his co-worker were attacked by Malay youths in Kampung Datuk Harun. He sustained head injuries. Anbalakan was assaulted by a few Malays youths when he stopped at the traffic light near Kampung Datuk Harun. He was on his way home to Sungai Buloh. He had leg injuries. Ramesan, a mute, was attacked in Kampung Medan, sustaining injuries on his legs and hands.

On 11 March 2001, Sahjahan, a Bangladeshi factory worker, was attacked by a man in Sungei Way. He fell unconscious and sustained injuries on his head and hands. Kathirvelu had nose and head injuries. Thinakaran had injuries on his hand and leg. Parthiban, 19, had stitches on the face and head. Anbarasan had injuries on his legs, hands and ear.

On 12 March 2001, Subramaniam was travelling from Brickfields in Kuala Lumpur to his home in Sri Sentosa when he was assaulted by Malay men. He had injuries on his head and back. Bakhshish Elahi, a Pakistani, and his partner were assaulted in a lorry by about 100 youths armed with pipes, swords and parangs. He had injuries on his head, legs and hand.

On 13 March 2001, A lorry driver and a factory supervisor were attacked by Malay youths with parangs. Four fingers on the supervisor's right hand were almost severed. He also had two slash wounds across his shoulders. The lorry driver's fingers on his left hand were almost severed. He also suffered a slash wound to the back of the head.

Aftermath

Reaction
The Menteri Besar of Selangor, Datuk Seri Dr Mohamed Khir Toyo, acted by securing the Hindu temple in Kampung Medan to prevent any further violence from the Malay community. He advised the Malay residence to act but abide the laws of the country.
Security forces also seized almost 100 weapons including home-made bombs, machetes, knives, samurai swords, catapults, chains, steel pipes, batons and axes from Malay youths.
Kampung Medan is a classic case of the urban poor working for crumbs," the Star newspaper said in an analysis. Mohammad Agus Yusoff, political science lecturer at the National University, told AFP that poor infrastructure and a host of socio-economic ills bred frustration. Dr. Kua Kia Soong, a social activist, criticized the security forces for failing to protect the people and acting without bias in the incidents similarly with the May 13 Incident. 
The then-president of Malaysian Indian Congress, Samy Vellu visited the corpse of K. Muneiretham in University Hospital. V. Segar, 34 dan A. Ganeson, 28 are among the few who died in the riot.

Casualties
The incident in the squatter area has left eight people dead and 24 hospitalised. Police said 183 people comprising 100 Malays, 14 Indonesians including two women, and 69 Indians have been arrested.

Cause of the riots
The main cause of the racial conflict that occurred in Kampung Medan on March 13, 2001 is poverty due to the government's negligence, as stated by Associate Professor Dr Mansor Mohd Noor. "If you are poor, you have the same problems. This is our problem, not a Malay or Indian problem," he added. According to Michael (1997), the causes of ethnic conflict can be categorised as state, structural, political, socio-economic and cultural factors (p. 5). It is stated by Dr Mansor Mohd Noor that the poverty and marginalisation has broken down the community and is unrelated to the government. The negligence of Kampung Medan by the government has led to an improper education system, lack of social activities, and the lack of resources to sustain a healthy community.

Controversies
In 2003, Yayasan Strategik Sosial (YSS) executive director Datuk Dr Denison Jayasooria's research paper was accused of falsely blaming the Indian youth for the riots by former Higher Education Minister Datuk Mustapa Mohamad. Misinterpretation in Ethnic Relations guidebook used his point without his consultation. “Nowhere in my articles on Kg Medan did I state that Indian youths were the sole cause of the Kg Medan tragedy. My position is clear that there are a multiplicity of factors and these have to be read in relation to one another,” he said, adding that it was of utmost importance that politicians read the full text. MP K. Devamany (BN – Cameron Highlands) stated that his (Datuk Dr Denison Jayasooria) statement is not associated with MIC and not an opinion by MIC too. MPs saw red during the debate on the Ethnic Relations guidebook at the Dewan Rakyat, with parliamentarians from both sides of the House questioning the merit of the controversial teaching guide. The reply by Higher Education Minister Datuk Mustapa Mohamed, especially on the Kampung Medan riots, irked not only Opposition MPs but also several from the Barisan Nasional. Mostly the culprits in Kampung Medan were youths but was not specifically stated any ethnic group.

Tempromental Solution
They introduce society activities such as the Rukun Tetangga. The members of Rukun Tetangga are the residents of the place they are patrolling because who else are better than the ones know those roads. The Rukun Tetangga art of the National Unity and Integration Action Plan, has been up since June 2007.

Legacy
To date, the racial relationship between the Indian and Malay has been incidentally severed in Selangor and Klang Valley. This riot is said to be the linked with several other cases of racial and religious protests and conflicts such as the 2007 HINDRAF rally, 2009 Cow's Head Protests, and the demolition of Hindu places of worship in Selangor such as the Malaimel Sri Selva Kaliamman Temple in Kuala Lumpur and the Sri Maha Mariamman temple in Batu Tiga.

In popular culture
A 2009 Malaysian drama film Talentime, a scene reminiscent of the Kampung Medan riots are included in the film.

See also
 2007 HINDRAF rally
 2009 Cow's Head Protests

References

Protests in Malaysia
History of Selangor
Selangor
Riots and civil disorder in Malaysia
History of Malaysia since Independence
Anti-Indian sentiment in Asia
Ethnic riots
Sectarian violence